Telecommunications in Bhutan includes telephones, radio, television, and the Internet.

Telephones

 Main lines: 27,900 lines in use, 179th in the world (2012).
 Mobile cellular: 560,000 lines, 165th in the world (2012).
 Telephone system:
 general assessment: Urban towns and district headquarters have telecommunications services (2012);
 domestic: very low tele-density, domestic service is poor especially in rural areas, mobile cellular service available since 2003 is now widely available (2012);
 international: international telephone and telegraph service via landline and microwave relay through India (2012);
 satellite earth station: 1 Intelsat (2012).
 Country codes: Bhutan +975, Phuentsholing (0)1, Thimphu (0)2, Bumthang (0)3, Paro (0)8.

Radio and television
 First radio station, Radio NYAB, privately launched in 1973, is now state-owned (2012).
 Five private radio stations are currently broadcasting (2012).
 Radios: 37,000 (1997).
 The Bhutan Broadcasting Service first commenced television transmissions in June 1999, upon legalizing television, one of the last countries in the world to do so.
 Cable TV service offers dozens of Indian and other international channels (2012).
 Televisions: 11,000 (1999).

Internet

 Top level domain: .bt
 Internet hosts: 14,590 hosts, 126th in the world (2012).
 IPv4: 23,552 addresses allocated, 32.9 per 1000 people (2012).
 Internet users: 182,338 users, 155th in the world; 25.4% of the population, 137th in the world (2012).
 Fixed broadband: 16,015 subscriptions, 135th in the world; 2.2% of population, 124th in the world (2012).
 Mobile broadband: 17,851 subscriptions, 133rd in the world; 2.5% of population, 122nd in the world (2012).
 Internet Service Providers: Bhutan's main and only ISP is Druknet, owned by Bhutan Telecom. It provides a dial-up service, at a reasonable cost.
 Internet cafes: Located in most large towns.

See also
  Censorship on the Internet
 Radio Waves, a radio station in located in Thimphu, Bhutan. Formed in December 2010, it is currently run by Kelzang Thinley and broadcasts in Dzongkha and English.

References

External links
 nic.bt, Bhutan Network Information Center.
 www.bbs.bt, Bhutan Broadcasting Service.
 Wireless Voice/Data Communication in Remote Bhutan

 
Bhutan
Bhutan
Bhutan